Nuhlar can refer to:

 Nuhlar, Bolu
 Nuhlar, Düzce